Scott David Rendell (born 21 October 1986) is an English footballer who plays as a striker for AFC Totton.

Career

Early career
Rendell was born in Ashford, Surrey, but lived in Basingstoke, Hampshire. He started his career with Staines Albion, where he played until the age of 16. After this, Rendell was signed onto the books of Aldershot Town before joining nearby Reading. Unable to break into the Reading first-team, he was loaned back to Aldershot, and had work experience loans at Forest Green Rovers and Hayes.

While at Forest Green, Rendell scored the club's first ever goal as a professional side on the opening day of the 2005–06 season against Cambridge United, who he would later go on to sign for.

Rendell had a successful spell with Crawley Town, initially on loan, before making the move permanent until the end of the 2006–07. He scored 11 goals in 42 league games for Crawley throughout the season.

Cambridge United
He joined Cambridge United on a free transfer in the summer of 2007. He started the season as a substitute, but following an injury to fellow striker Lee Boylan, he was given a first-team opportunity and scored 22 goals by mid-February.

Peterborough United
On 18 February 2008, Rendell joined Cambridge's rivals Peterborough United on loan with a view to a permanent transfer. He scored three goals in ten games towards the end of the 2007–08 season as Peterborough won promotion to League One. The move was made permanent in May for a fee of £115,000. However, after failing to make an impact at London Road during the beginning of the 2008–09 season due to the success of the forward pairing of Craig Mackail-Smith and Aaron McLean, Rendell joined Yeovil Town on loan for one month.

Return to Cambridge United
When the Yeovil loan expired, Rendell re-joined his former club, Cambridge United, on an initial loan until January 2009. After negotiation, his loan at Cambridge was extended until the end of the season. Rendell went on to score a 119th-minute winning goal against Stevenage Borough in the second leg of the 2009 Conference Premier play-off semi-final, sending Cambridge into the final, which they lost to Torquay United.
Peterborough rejected a bid from York City to sign Rendell on loan for the 2009–10 season in July 2009.

Torquay United
In July 2009, Rendell signed for League Two side Torquay United on a year-long loan. He scored 13 times for the club across 41 games.

Wycombe Wanderers
In June 2010 Rendell signed for an undisclosed fee for League Two side Wycombe Wanderers. In his first season as a Wycombe player he topped the goalscoring charts at the club, with a return of 19 goals, 9 of which were penalties. Wycombe won promotion to League One and Rendell struggled to replicate his scoring form. In October 2011 he was loaned out to Bristol Rovers for one month.

On 31 January 2012 Rendell signed on loan for Oxford United until the end of the season, where he scored three goals in 18 appearances.

Luton Town
On 20 June 2012 Rendell signed for Conference Premier side Luton Town on a two-year contract for an undisclosed fee from Wycombe Wanderers. This move reunited him with manager Paul Buckle, who he had played under at Torquay and Bristol Rovers. Rendell scored his first goal for the Hatters in a 3–1 victory against Ebbsfleet United on 27 August 2012.

On 26 January 2013 Rendell scored the winning goal in Luton's fourth round FA Cup match against Premier League team Norwich City. He scored 12 goals in 47 games over the 2012–13 season, but was transfer listed by new Luton manager John Still in April 2013.
In July 2013, he had a trial at former club Torquay United, but suffered a hamstring strain in a friendly match against Salisbury and returned to Luton.

On 13 September 2013, Rendell joined Conference Premier side Woking on loan for three months. He scored on his debut against Tamworth and went on to score six further league goals in 15 matches before returning to Luton. In January 2014, he went on trial once again with Torquay, but was not offered a contract. Rendell was released from his Luton contract by mutual consent later that month.

Woking
On 30 January 2014, Rendell signed contractual forms for Woking until the end of the 2013–14 season. He was the leading scorer for the club for the following two seasons winning numerous player of the season honours after an outstanding 2014–15 season. He signed a contract for 2015–16 season with The Cards. However his season came to an end just 40 minutes into the start of the campaign after a cruciate knee ligament rupture playing against Tranmere Rovers Over £10,000 was raised by a supporter-led fundraising campaign in order to fund the treatment of said injury, though Rendell later went on to play for local rivals Aldershot Town F.C., frequently scoring in derby games against the Cards.

Return to Aldershot Town
On 23 June 2016, Rendell joined Woking's local rivals Aldershot Town on a one-year deal. On 6 August 2016, Rendell made his Aldershot Town debut in a 1–0 defeat against Barrow, replacing Will Evans at half-time.

He signed a new one-year contract with Aldershot in May 2018.

Eastleigh
On 31 May 2019, Rendell signed a one-year contract with Eastleigh following his release from Aldershot. Rendell was released at the end of the 2019-20 season.

Maidstone United
On 10 July 2020, Maidstone United announced the signing of Rendell.

Havant & Waterlooville
At the end of the 2020–21 season, Rendell joined Havant & Waterlooville. Rendell was released at the end of the 2021–22 season.

AFC Totton
On 25 June 2022, Rendell signed for Southern Football League Division One South club AFC Totton.

Personal life
Rendell is married to Sam. The couple had a son, Alfie, who was born four weeks prematurely in late 2010 and died on Christmas Eve of the same year. The couple have since had two more children, Finley (born 2012) and Lottie (born 2013).

Career statistics

References

External links

Profile at UpThePosh! The Peterborough United Database

1986 births
Living people
People from Ashford, Surrey
Sportspeople from Basingstoke
English footballers
Association football forwards
Aldershot Town F.C. players
Eastleigh F.C. players
Reading F.C. players
Forest Green Rovers F.C. players
Hayes F.C. players
Crawley Town F.C. players
Cambridge United F.C. players
Peterborough United F.C. players
Yeovil Town F.C. players
Torquay United F.C. players
Wycombe Wanderers F.C. players
Bristol Rovers F.C. players
Oxford United F.C. players
Luton Town F.C. players
Woking F.C. players
Maidstone United F.C. players
Havant & Waterlooville F.C. players
A.F.C. Totton players
English Football League players
National League (English football) players
Footballers from Surrey
Footballers from Hampshire